Gibberula lessingae is a species of sea snail, a marine gastropod mollusk, in the family Cystiscidae. It is named after Doris Lessing.

Description
The length of the shell attains 2.52 mm.

Distribution
This marine species occurs off Guadeloupe.

References

lessingae
Gastropods described in 2015